Gibsonville School is a historic school building located at Gibsonville, Guilford County, North Carolina. It was built in 1924, and is a two-story, seven bay, rectangular brick building with a Colonial Revival style entrance.  It has a "U"-shape plan with parallel projecting 1930s rear wings.  Also on the property are the contributing 1937 home economics building (now the Gibsonville Public Library) and a 1951 gymnasium.

It was listed on the National Register of Historic Places in 2014.

References

School buildings on the National Register of Historic Places in North Carolina
Colonial Revival architecture in North Carolina
School buildings completed in 1924
Schools in Guilford County, North Carolina
National Register of Historic Places in Guilford County, North Carolina
1924 establishments in North Carolina